Patrick Groc (born 6 September 1960) is a French fencer. He won a bronze medal in the team foil event at the 1984 Summer Olympics.

References

External links
 

1960 births
Living people
French male foil fencers
Olympic fencers of France
Fencers at the 1984 Summer Olympics
Fencers at the 1988 Summer Olympics
Fencers at the 1992 Summer Olympics
Olympic bronze medalists for France
Olympic medalists in fencing
Sportspeople from Neuilly-sur-Seine
Medalists at the 1984 Summer Olympics
20th-century French people
21st-century French people